Mary Willson may refer to:
 Mary Elizabeth Willson, American gospel singer, composer, and evangelist
 Mary Ann Willson,  American folk artist

See also
 Mary Wilson (disambiguation)